The Aroostook Valley Country Club is a golf course which straddles the Canada–US border, between the U.S. state of Maine and the Canadian province of New Brunswick. The club, located near Perth-Andover, New Brunswick and Fort Fairfield, Maine, has its course (except part of the tee area for the ninth hole, and possibly part of a sand trap on the first hole) and clubhouse on the Canadian side of the border and its parking lot and pro shop on the American side. Although the course is located entirely on one side of the border, three holes are close enough to the border that crooked shots enter the United States. The club was founded in 1929; its position on the border allowed American golfers to bypass Prohibition without passing through customs. Current club membership is roughly half Canadian and half American.

Since the only entry to the course is on the American side of the border, American golfers can use the entire club without reporting to a Port of Entry. Canadian golfers historically used a small local road, Brown Road, to cross the border and access the country club; while Canada had a seasonal border checkpoint on the road, entry to the U.S. had been unsecured since the 1950s. In 2008, however, the U.S. border officials closed the unpatrolled border crossing on Brown Road, citing increased concerns over terrorism and a drug sale on the course in 2006. The closure required Canadian golfers to make a  detour through Fort Fairfield to access the course and was criticized by the Fort Fairfield town manager and the country club's golf pro. U.S. Senator Susan Collins and Canadian MP Mike Allen proposed that U.S. border officials establish a new seasonal border checkpoint on Brown Road. As of 2019, the Four Falls Border Crossing is a seasonally open border checkpoint along Brown Road on the Canadian side.

During the COVID-19 pandemic of 2020–21, Canadian traffic to the golf club was diverted away from the US by crossing from Brown Road southbound onto private land to reach the parking lot, then operating golf carts beside Russell Road (but not on it, as the road is in the US) to reach the course.

Scorecard

References

External links
Aroostook Valley Country Club

Golf clubs and courses in Maine
Golf clubs and courses in New Brunswick
Canada–United States border
Fort Fairfield, Maine
Victoria County, New Brunswick